Director may refer to:

Literature
 Director (magazine), a British magazine
 The Director (novel), a 1971 novel by Henry Denker
 The Director (play), a 2000 play by Nancy Hasty

Music
 Director (band), an Irish rock band
 Director (Avant album) (2006)
 Director (Yonatan Gat album)

Occupations and positions

Arts and design
 Animation director
 Artistic director
 Creative director
 Design director
 Film director
 Music director
 Music video director
 Sports director
 Television director
 Theatre director

Positions in other fields
 Director (business), a senior-level management position
 Director (colonial), head of chartered company's colonial administration for a territory
 Director (education), head of a university or other educational body
 Company director, a member of (for example) a board of directors
 Cruise director
 Executive director
 Finance director or chief financial officer
 Funeral director
 Managing director
 Non-executive director
 Technical director
 Tournament director

Science and technology
 Director (military), a device that continuously calculates firing data
 Adobe Director, multimedia authoring software
 Fibre Channel director, a large switch for computer storage networks
 Director telephone system, or Director exchange
 GCR Class 11E or Directors, a class of locomotive
 Director, the spatial and temporal average of the orientation of the long molecular axis within a small volume element of liquid crystal

Other uses
 Director (1969 film), a Soviet film directed by Alexey Saltykov
 Director (2009 film), an American film directed by Aleks Rosenberg
 The Director, an artificial intelligence system in the video game Left 4 Dead
 HMS Director (1784), a ship of the British Royal Navy
 Directors beer, by Courage Brewery

People with the surname
 Aaron Director (1901–2004), professor at the University of Chicago Law School
 Kim Director (born 1974), American actress

See also
 Deputy Director (disambiguation)
 Directeur sportif, a person directing a cycling team during a road bicycle racing event
 Director-general
 Director string, a way of tracking free variables in computation
 French Directory, the executive committee of the French Revolutionary government between 1795 and 1799

kk:Режиссер